Inside Canada is a Canadian variety television series which aired on CBC Television from 1973 to 1974.

Premise
This Winnipeg-produced series began as a three-episode run in July 1973. Music was combined with comedy sequences with a Canadian focus. Reception to this initial run led to an eight-episode run a year later.

Scheduling
This half-hour series was broadcast in the first season on Mondays at 7:30 p.m. (Eastern) from 16 to 30 July 1973, and in the second season on Saturdays at 10:00 p.m. from 13 July to 5 October 1974.

References

External links
 
 

CBC Television original programming
1973 Canadian television series debuts
1974 Canadian television series endings
1970s Canadian variety television series